Petrotilapia chrysos is a species of cichlid endemic to Lake Malawi where it is only known from around the southern islands of Chinyankwazi and Chinyamwezi.  It prefers rocky substrates where it can graze on the algae growing on the rocks.  This species can reach a length  SL.

References

chrysos
Fish of Lake Malawi
Fish of Malawi
Fish described in 1996
Taxa named by Jay Richard Stauffer Jr.
Taxonomy articles created by Polbot